J'Tia Hart (née Taylor; born September 1, 1981) is a nuclear engineer, model, and television personality. She is the Chief Science Officer for National and Homeland Security at the Idaho National Laboratory and competed on Survivor: Cagayan.

Early life and education 
Hart is a native of Miami and the youngest of 10 children. She attended Miami-Dade County Public Schools. While studying at Hialeah Miami Lakes Senior High School she pursued extra mathematics and science classes, which lead to an early graduation at the age of 15. Hart continued her studies at Florida State University. At 17 Hart took a school trip to visit a nuclear submarine, which piqued her interest. Despite her interest in math, science, and nuclear engineering Hart first pursued a career in modeling before earning her master's and doctoral degrees in nuclear engineering from the University of Illinois at Urbana-Champaign. She was the first Black woman to receive a PhD from the department.

Career

Nuclear engineering career 
Hart previously worked as a program lead at Argonne National Lab before becoming the Chief Science Officer at Idaho National Laboratory.

Hart is an advocate for women and people of color in STEM. She is the founder of STEM Queens, a web series highlighting the accomplishments of Black women in STEM. Hart is also an If/Then ambassador and was featured in the Smithsonian's "#IfThenSheCan – The Exhibit", a collection of life-sized 3D-printed statues of role models in STEM.

Television career 
After competing on season 28 of Survivor, Hart created a petition for the show to become more diverse.

Personal life 
Hart lives in Chicago with her husband and two children.

References 

1981 births
Living people
Grainger College of Engineering alumni
Survivor (American TV series) contestants
American nuclear engineers
American models
Florida State University alumni
Argonne National Laboratory people